ArataAfar af ( Arraqta) is a coastal village in eastern Eritrea.

Location
The town is located in the Are'eta district of the Southern Red Sea region. It sits at a latitude of 14° 40' 60N and a longitude of 40° 58' 0E.

Anrata lies 0.6 miles from the district capital of Tiyo, on the southern outskirts of the town.

References
Anrata, Eritrea Page

Southern Red Sea Region
Villages in Eritrea